Ruslan Zabranskyi (born 10 March 1971) is a Ukrainian professional football coach and a former player.

Career
Zabranskyi after retiring as footballer became a manager in some amateur clubs in Mykolaiv. The main highlight of his managing career in the beginning was a champion's title of FC Voronivka in the 2007 Mykolaiv Oblast Championship. Since 2008 he works in MFC Mykolaiv for which he played.

References

External links

1971 births
Living people
Soviet footballers
Ukrainian footballers
Ukrainian football managers
FC Karpaty Lviv players
MFC Mykolaiv players
FC Kryvbas Kryvyi Rih players
FC Kryvbas-2 Kryvyi Rih players
FC Spartak Ivano-Frankivsk players
FC Nyva Vinnytsia players
SC Tavriya Simferopol players
FC Enerhiya Yuzhnoukrainsk players
MFC Mykolaiv managers
Association football forwards
Sportspeople from Lviv Oblast